The Cape Mount Nature Conservation Unit is found in Liberia. It was established in 1977. This site is 554 km.

It belongs to the IUCN category IV.

References

Grand Cape Mount County
Protected areas of Liberia
Protected areas established in 1977